Hitachinokuni Sōshagū (常陸國總社宮, Hitachinokuni sōshagu, also 常陸国総社宮 and 總社神社) is a Shinto shrine located in Ishioka, Ibaraki Prefecture, Japan. According to legend, it was founded in the Tenpyō period, c. 729-749. It enshrines the kami Izanagi (伊弉諾尊), Ōkuninushi (大国主尊), Susanoo-no-Mikoto (素戔嗚尊), Ninigi-no-Mikoto (瓊々杵尊), Omiyanome (大宮比売尊), and Futsunomitama (布留大神).

See also
List of Shinto shrines in Japan

External links
Official website

Shinto shrines in Ibaraki Prefecture